The Nocardiopsaceae are a family of bacteria.

References 

Actinomycetota